
Year 224 BC was a year of the pre-Julian Roman calendar. At the time it was known as the Year of the Consulship of Torquatus and Flaccus (or, less frequently, year 530 Ab urbe condita). The denomination 224 BC for this year has been used since the early medieval period, when the Anno Domini calendar era became the prevalent method in Europe for naming years.

Events 
 By place 
 Greece 
 After the Spartan King Cleomenes III takes on Pellene, Phlius and Argos, Aratus of Sicyon is forced to call upon King Antigonus III of Macedonia for assistance. Antigonus III's forces fail to pierce Cleomenes' lines near Corinth, but a revolt against Cleomenes at Argos put the Spartans on the defensive.

 Roman Republic 
 The Romans, led by Consuls Gaius Atilius Regulus and Lucius Aemilius Papus, decisively defeat the coalition of Cisalpine Gallic tribes at the Battle of Telamon thus extending Roman influence over northern Italy. On the Roman side Gaius Atilius Regulus, commander of the Roman cavalry, is killed in the battle. On the Gallic side, one of the leaders, Concolitanus, is captured in battle, while the leader of the Gaesatae, Aneroëstes, kills himself when the battle is lost.

 China 
 Qin begins the invasion of Chu. Initially, the Qin generals Li Xin and Meng Tian capture several cities and defeat the Chu army. 
 The Qin Prime Minister Lord Changping, who was born in Chu, incites a Chu rebellion against the Qin invaders. He and the Chu general Xiang Yan then surprise and defeat the Qin army led by Li Xin and Meng Tian in the Battle of Chengfu.
 Taking command of the Qin war effort, Wang Jian twice defeats Xiang Yan and captures Fuchu, the king of Chu, as well as the Chu capital Chen and the city of Pingyu.
 Xiang Yan retreats his forces south of the Huai River and makes Lord Changping the new king of Chu.

Births

Deaths 
 Agiatis, Spartan queen
 Aneroëstes, leader of the Gallic Gaesatae (suicide)
 Dasharatha, Mauryan emperor (approximate date)

References